Ishq Brandy is a Punjabi comedy film directed by Amit Prasher, Starring Roshan Prince,  Binnu Dhillon, Shobhita Rana, Alfaaz. Japji Khaira. Movie is produced under banner Future Cine Vision. Film Music is given by Yo Yo Honey Singh and Sachh & Lyrics by Alfaaz. Ishq Brandy was released on 21 February  2014.

Cast
Alfaaz as Tejbir Cheema
Roshan Prince as Gura 
Binnu Dhillon as Preetam
Wamiqa Gabbi as Kimmi
Japji Khaira as Simran
Shobhita Rana as Chandani
B. N. Sharma as King Don
Balkran Singh
Gurpreet Kaur
Navjot Singh
Karamjit Anmol
Shivendra Mahal

Crew

 Director : Amit Prasher
 Production House : Future Cine Vision
 Producers : Mahesh Garg, Satish Aggarwal, Randhir Singh Dheera, Dimple Mittal, Babbu Mittal
 Co-Produced By : Amit Mann, Deepak Kumar, Rajinder Sharma
 DOP : Jalesh Oberoi
 Written By : Rupinder Inderjit
 Editor : Manish More
 Action : Abbas Ali Moghul
 Music : Yo Yo Honey Singh & Sachh
 Assistant Directors : Amarjit Singh, Rohit Kumar, Ojaswee Sharma, Rahul Anand, Vivek Saini, Devinder Virdi, Sandeep Punj

Reception
Monita Sharma from Ballewood.in, a website on Punjabi film industry, wrote, "Ishq Brandy is a light-hearted entertainer that was desperately needed to end the lull phase that Punjabi cinema had been going through for some time."

Awards

Nominated
PTC Punjabi Film Award for Best Background Score - Salil Amrute
PTC Punjabi Film Award for Best Cinematography - Jalesh Oberoi
PTC Punjabi Film Award for Best Lyricist - Alfaaz for Hajj
PTC Punjabi Film Award for Best Playback Singer (Male) - Alfaaz for Hajj
PTC Punjabi Film Award for Best Supporting Actress - Wamiqa Gabbi
PTC Punjabi Film Award for Best Actor - Roshan Prince

References

2014 films
Punjabi-language Indian films
2010s Punjabi-language films